Yoo Seung-ho (born August 17, 1993) is a South Korean actor who rose to fame as a child actor in the film The Way Home (2002). Since then, he has starred in many television series and movie films as a child and teenager.

After his two-year mandatory military service, he starred in the legal drama Remember (2015), historical films Joseon Magician (2015) and Seondal: The Man Who Sells the River (2016) as well as historical drama The Emperor: Owner of the Mask (2017), romance comedy series I'm Not a Robot (2017), and SBS's high school drama My Strange Hero (2018).

Early life and education
Born and raised in Incheon, Yoo is the younger of two siblings, he later claimed that his family had been poor.

Yoo graduated from Baekshin High School in February 2012. He decided not to pursue a college degree in order to concentrate on his acting career.

Career

1999–2009: Beginnings as a child actor
Yoo made his entertainment debut in a cellphone commercial in 1999 after Yoo's mother sent in a photo of her son to an ad agency.

In 2000 Yoo began his career as a child actor, first appearing in the television drama Daddy Fish. He rose to stardom in his first film The Way Home, playing a bratty city boy who learns to appreciate country life when he's forced to spend the summer with his deaf-mute grandmother. The low-budget film was a surprise box office hit in 2002, drawing more than 4 million admissions. He was then affectionately labeled as "Nation's Little Brother". Thereafter, Yoo also starred in animal movie Hearty Paws (2006) about a boy and his beloved dog, and Unforgettable (2008) about school children from a remote island who go on a field trip to a candy factory in Seoul during the 1970s.

He continued acting in television, appearing in Magic Warriors Mir & Gaon (2005), an adventure series for children. Yoo further built his filmography, playing younger counterparts of male protagonists in television dramas, including general Yi Sun-sin in Immortal Admiral Yi Sun-sin (2004), King Seongjong in The King and I (2007), and Gwanggaeto the Great in The Legend (2007).

In 2009, Yoo starred in the action film City of Fathers and thriller film 4th Period Mystery. He also played Kim Chunchu in the period epic Queen Seondeok.

2010–2014: Teen roles

In his teens, Yoo was cast in one of the major roles in Master of Study (2010), a Korean screen adaptation of Japanese manga Dragon Zakura. He then played a more mature role in Flames of Desire, as the second-generation son of a wealthy chaebol family who is uninterested in the battles of succession among his relatives and becomes a married man at 21. Later that year, Yoo sang a duet with singer/actress IU titled "Believe in Love" for the charity program Love Request. The song's lyrics was based on a diary that Yoo had written while seeing orphans of war in the slums of Sri Lanka.

In 2011, Yoo trained in swordplay and martial arts in his role as an assassin in Warrior Baek Dong-soo, an action-period drama based on the manhwa by Lee Jae-heon. He also voiced Greenie, Leafie's adopted son, on Leafie, a Hen into the Wild, which was adapted from a bestselling children's novel by Hwang Sun-mi. He then co-starred with Kim Ha-neul in the thriller Blind.

In 2012, Yoo was cast in his first role as a leading man in Operation Proposal, a Korean remake of the Japanese drama Proposal Daisakusen. This was followed by a supporting role as the Jade Emperor, ruler of the heavens, in the fantasy-period drama Arang and the Magistrate. Afterwards, he starred in the melodrama Missing You, playing a cold man who hides a vengeance-filled heart behind his seemingly gentle smile.

Known in the press as "Little So Ji-sub" for his resemblance to the said actor, in 2013 Yoo starred in the music video for So's single "Eraser" together with Park Shin-hye. This was his second time promoting So's musical endeavors, after "Lonely Life" in 2008. Following that, Yoo's first photo book titled Travel Letter, Spring Snow, And... was published; it was the last project shot by celebrity photographer Bori before her death on April 9, 2013.

2015–present: Adult roles and rising popularity
As his first post-army project, Yoo appeared in the music video for Naul's "You From the Same Time" in 2015. He was next cast as a stubborn webcomic writer raising a cat in the TV adaptation of webtoon Imaginary Cat. Yoo followed this by starring in the joseon-era romance film The Magician directed by Kim Dae-seung, in which he plays a circus magician who falls in love with a princess. Yoo was then cast in SBS's legal thriller series Remember as a lawyer with hyperthymesia who defends his father on death row.

In 2016, Yoo starred in the historical comedy film Seondal: The Man Who Sells the River as the titular character Kim Seon-dal. In 2017, he starred in MBC's historical melodrama The Emperor: Owner of the Mask and romantic-comedy I'm Not a Robot. In 2018, he was cast in SBS's high school drama My Strange Hero. In 2020, Yoo starred in the mystery thriller Memorist as a detective in the police force with the power to read people's memories.

In 2021, Yoo played a passionate inspector in KBS2 historical drama Moonshine.

In March 2022, Yoo signed with new agency YG Entertainment.

Personal life
Yoo enlisted for his mandatory military service in the army on March 5, 2013, where he reportedly became an instructor training new recruits. He was discharged on December 4, 2014.

Filmography

Film

Television series

Web series

Television shows

Discography

Bibliography

Awards and nominations

References

External links

 
 Yoo Seung-ho Official Instagram at Instagram 
 Yoo Seung-ho Official Fan Cafe at Daum 
 
 
 

South Korean male television actors
South Korean male film actors
South Korean male child actors
People from Incheon
1993 births
Living people
YG Entertainment artists